The FIS Nordic Junior and U23 World Ski Championships 2008 took place in Mals, Italy and Zakopane, Poland from 23 February to 29 February 2008. It was the 31st Junior World Championships and the 3rd Under-23 World Championships in nordic skiing.

Medal summary

Junior events

Cross-country skiing

Nordic Combined

Ski jumping

Under-23 events

Cross-country skiing

Medal table

All events

Junior events

Under-23 events

References 

2008
2008 in cross-country skiing
2008 in ski jumping
Junior World Ski Championships
2008 in youth sport
International sports competitions hosted by Italy
International sports competitions hosted by Poland